John Henry Chinner (30 June 1865 – 15 December 1933) was a South Australian artist, best known for his caricatures of prominent people.

History
Chinner was born in Brighton, South Australia, son of George Williams Chinner (c. 1824 – 27 May 1880), and his second wife Mary Chinner, née Edwards.
Chinner, pḕre, arrived in SA before 1847, had a drapery shop on Rundle Street. He married Caroline Bowen (c. 1831 – 29 April 1861) on 6 April 1849. By 1859 he was a Hindley Street publican, Mayor of Brighton in 1860 and longtime councillor. He married Mary Edwards on 8 September 1863.
In 1879 he was enrolled at Prince Alfred College as a boarder, and later was a prominent batsman in the annual cricket match against St Peter's College.
This was the start of a lifelong commitment as an active member and finally president of the PAC Old Collegians' Association, longtime member of the College Committee and for 22 years the Council's Honorary Secretary.
The family moved to Parkside around 1880 and Chinner became involved with the local church literary society, taught bible classes, and was promoted by Alfred Catt to Sunday school superintendent.
His devout, methodical, serious nature and no-nonsense leadership style made the Parkside Wesleyan Methodist Sunday school an example that other churches sought to emulate.
His admiration for the Song of Australia as a National Anthem was tempered by Caroline Carleton's lack of reference to God, which Chinner made good with an additional verse:

His interest in caricature was first shown with contributions to the Literary Society's magazine, in which he published sketches of fellow-members, and it was not long before his work was to be seen in the pages of Quiz, The Bulletin and London Punch.
He was a Fellow of the South Australian Society of Arts, and was urged by H. P. Gill to make a profession of his hobby.

Outside these interests he was an accountant — he was for 31 years Adelaide manager for the Atlas Insurance Company, retiring in January 1925.

Notable Citizens
Chinner produced a series of around 250 caricatures between 1923 and 1928 for the Adelaide Saturday Journal, No. 1 being of the South Australian Governor, Sir Tom Bridges.

Many of these were also carried by sister-publications The Register and The Observer.

The last of the series may have been of Charles Bastard, lessee of Adelaide's City Baths. Around 180 of these are listed below:

James Alfred Pearce (1873–1944) drew caricatures in a similar style for the Adelaide News in a series entitled "Familiar Figures" in 1930. No. 19, Frank L. Gratton may be viewed here. Pearce was born in Burra to Cornish parents.
Lionel Coventry (1906–1986) was a later News caricaturist, seen here and here (F. L. Parker in 1945 and 1949 respectively)

Other interests
Although Chinner was best known for his caricatures, he was also a fine painter in watercolors.

He was also known for his skill as a poet, particularly as a hymnwriter.

He was deeply involved in municipal affairs, and was a longtime member of the Unley Council and served as mayor.

He was a board member of the Epworth Book Depot for over thirty years.

He was a lifelong supporter of Prince Alfred College in every aspect of its activities.

Family

Chinner married Harriet Agnes Wallace (died 22 September 1948) at Parkside Wesleyan Church on 11 September 1889. Their children were:
Mary Wallace Chinner (3 October 1890 – ) 
Dorothy Agnes Chinner (27 March 1892 – )
Marjorie Wallace Chinner (29 August 1894 – )
Harry Wallace Chinner (26 December 1896 – 11 July 1975)
John Wallace Chinner (5 March 1901 – )
They had a home at 33 Foster street, Parkside.

Notes and references

Gallery
A few "notable citizens":

1865 births
1933 deaths
Australian caricaturists
Australian Methodists
Artists from Adelaide